Božena Machačová-Dostálová (25 September 1903, Havlíčkův Brod – 20 May 1973, Prague) was a Czech politician.

She was appointed Minister of Consumer Industry in 1954.

References

1903 births
1973 deaths
Politicians from Havlíčkův Brod
20th-century Czech women politicians
Government ministers of Czechoslovakia